Joel Bailey (born April 25, 1951) is a former professional tennis player from the United States.

Biography
Bailey was born in Florida but based in Memphis, Tennessee. An All-American varsity tennis player at Samford University, Bailey began competing internationally in the late 1970s. 

He won a Grand Prix doubles title in Lagos, Nigeria with Bruce Kleege in 1979. 

In singles, he had his first big match win at Sarasota in 1980 when he saved triple match points to upset Steve Krulevitz, from a set and 2–5 down. He had only entered the tournament as a wild card, which was awarded as he was the son of Mack Bailey, who owned the company that sponsored the tournament. At the Tulsa that year he made the quarter-finals, his best performance in a Grand Prix tournament. He competed in the main draw of the 1981 Wimbledon Championships and had a two set lead over Kevin Curren in their first round encounter, but lost in five.

From the 1980s he lived in Japan and appeared in many tournaments in that country, as well as earning a living teaching tennis. He twice won the doubles title at the ATP Challenger event in Nagoya.

Grand Prix career finals

Doubles: 1 (1–0)

Challenger titles

Doubles: (3)

References

External links
 
 

1951 births
Living people
American male tennis players
Samford University alumni
Tennis people from Florida
Sportspeople from West Palm Beach, Florida
American expatriate sportspeople in Japan
College men's tennis players in the United States